Ishq Ke Parindey   is a Hindi-language film starring Rishi Verma and Priyanka Mehta. The movie portrays the Indo-Pak conflict against the backdrop of a love story, and bears a message of peace.

Synopsis
An innocent and beautiful Pakistani girl, Sheen arrives in Lucknow along with her family. There she meets Faiz, and love blossoms, but results in a deadly fight against their families.

Production
The film was shot entirely in Lucknow, including at such famous locales as - Rumi Gate, [which?] Imambada, Hazratganj, Sheesh Mahal, Qaiser Bagh, Begum Hazrat Mahal Maqbara, the Residency, Jehangirabad Palace, Sultanat Manzil, Dada Miyan Dargah, and Teelewaali Masjid.  The director of the film, Shakir Khan  has been an associate director under Subhash Ghai on films like Pardes, Taal and Yaadein. DoP Najeeb Khan earlier served as cinematographer of blockbuster Gadar.

Cast
Rishi Verma as Faiz
Priyanka Mehta as Sheen
Manjul Azad as Kadir Bhai
Abid Yunus Khan as Informer
Yasir Iftikhar Khan as Shadab

Soundtrack

The album has six songs and one qawwali, "Maula Karde Karam", sung by Javed Ali, Altamash Faridi, Aftab and Hashim Sabri.  The other songs are sung by KK, Sonu Nigam, Javed Ali, and  Palak Muchhal. KK sang in the film's signature song "Dil Tod Ke", composed by Vijay Vermaa, with lyrics by Manoj Muntashir, released on 8 April 2015.

Javed Ali and Palak Muchhal performed the romantic duet "Rab Se Maangi".  Vijay Vermaa, Rashid Khan, and Sajjad Ali composed the songs, and Shakeel Azmi, Shakir Khan, Manthan, Irshad Khan, and Tanveer Ghazi wrote the lyrics.

Track listing

References

External links
 
 

2015 films
2010s Hindi-language films
2010s Urdu-language films